Mr. Opportunity (sometimes referred to as "Mr. O.") was an animated character that was used in marketing by American Honda Motor Company, a subsidiary of Honda Motors.  From 2004 until 2011, he has appeared in Honda advertisements as their mascot during their annual Honda Clearance event. Mr. Opportunity informs the viewers (or listeners if it's on the radio) of the deals being offered by Honda during the model year-end clearance event.  His typical tagline is “I’m Mr. Opportunity, [knocks on “glass” or microphone] and I'm knockin'!”, although more recent commercials didn't always use this tagline, and in subsequent years a neutral thumping sound for television rather than a screen knock was used, ceding to the fact LCD televisions had become more prevalent among viewers.

In 2010, for unknown reasons, Honda began their campaign referencing 'Opportunity is knocking', but the commercials aired without Mr. Opportunity being seen at all. Several weeks into the campaign Mr. Opportunity began making on-screen visits, however as noted above, his traditional trademark antics in 2010 have been modified.

Mr. Opportunity's TV commercials were animated by LAIKA/house in Portland, Oregon and the animation was directed by Aaron Sorenson entirely in the classic 2D animation style.

In September 2011, due to the earthquake and tsunami in Japan, which affected Honda's supply chain, the campaign ended and was replaced by the "Good Reasons" campaign, with actor Patrick Warburton making jabs at a cardboard Mr. Opportunity in the introductory ad about a "man doing a cartoon man's job".

Character design and look
Mr. Opportunity appeared as a White man in his thirties. He has dark-blonde hair that is slightly up at the front in a kind of "cowlick" fashion and has green eyes. He typically wears a light-blue dress shirt with the sleeves rolled up, light brown slacks, and dark brown shoes. In older commercials, he wore a gray sport coat over that outfit. In the 2010 commercial "Paparazzi," Mr. Opportunity wore a dark blue suit and white collared shirt.

Voice portrayal 
From 2004 to 2011, he was voiced by Rob Paulsen in the American commercials. In the Spanish dub of the commercials, he was voiced by Eduardo Iduñate.

Radio
In radio commercials, Mr. Opportunity is, at times, joined by another person who usually expresses a certain amount of excitement upon meeting him.  An example of this is as follows:

In these radio ads, Mr. Opportunity makes frequent reference to the fact that he is animated (i.e., not real, unlike the people around him).  In one radio ad, he admits that coffee "goes right through [him]" when Sally asks him if he wants to get a cup with her (this obviously pokes fun at Mr. Opportunity's "intangibility").

See also
Honda
Rob Paulsen

References

External links
 LAIKA/House – Official site
Animation Nation – Discussion board

Honda
Male characters in advertising
Mascots introduced in 2004
Automobile advertising characters